Fulong is a Taiwan Railways Administration Yilan line station, located at Fulong Village, Gongliao District, New Taipei, Taiwan.

Structure 
 Two island platforms

Service 
 Currently, (2013) the station is classified as a third-class station by TRA standards.

History 
 Original station name was Washi (控子) in Japanese during construction, but the correct character is 挖子.
 On 30 November 1924, the station was opened under the name Okutei (澳底), which is a fishing port located 6 km north to this station.
 On 1 December 1952, the station name was changed into the current name.
 On 25 July 2005, reconstruction of the station's main structure was finished. This reconstruction was managed by the Northeast Coast National Scenic Area Administration, and sponsored by Taipower Company. The name board of the station is written in the imitation Song typeface, which is unique among TRA stations.

Nearby landmarks 
 Fulong Beach
 Northeast Coast National Scenic Area
 Longmen Nuclear Power Plant
 Old Caoling Tunnel

See also
 List of railway stations in Taiwan

References

1924 establishments in Taiwan
Railway stations in New Taipei
Railway stations opened in 1924
Railway stations served by Taiwan Railways Administration